The Burns House is a historic house in Yankton, South Dakota. It was built in 1886 for Robert Burns, a banker who served as the president of the Mortgage Bank. It was acquired by George Durand, the vice president of Yankton College, in the 1900s. Durand and his wife were art collectors. The house was designed in the Queen Anne architectural style, with a tower. It has been listed on the National Register of Historic Places since February 9, 2001.

References

National Register of Historic Places in Yankton County, South Dakota
Queen Anne architecture in South Dakota
Houses completed in 1886
1886 establishments in Dakota Territory